The Multan Museum is located in the city of Multan and the Multan District, in Punjab Province of eastern Pakistan.

Collections
The Multan Museum contains a fine collection of coins, medals, postage stamps of the former  State of Bahawalpur, manuscripts, documented inscriptions, wood carvings, camel-skin paintings, historical models and stone carvings of the Islamic and Pre-Islamic periods.

New building
A new home for the Multan Museum is under reconstruction. The City Government and Punjab Government are converting the Ghanta Ghar building into the new Multan Museum.

See also
List of museums in Pakistan

References

Tourist attractions in Multan
Museums in Punjab, Pakistan
Buildings and structures in Multan